Pymatuning State Park is a Pennsylvania state park covering   in Conneaut, North Shenango, Pine, Sadsbury, South Shenango, West Fallowfield and West Shenango Townships, Crawford County, Pennsylvania, in the United States. A three-mile (5 km) causeway extends between Pennsylvania and Ohio near the center of the lake. The lake provides fishing and boating year round. There are two natural areas, Clark Island and Blackjack in the park. The park is also home to the University of Pittsburgh's Pymatuning Laboratory of Ecology. Like all Pennsylvania state parks, admission to the Pymatuning State Park is free. The northern access for Pymatuning State Park can be reached from U.S. Route 6 and the southern access is reached from U.S. Route 322.

Pymatuning State Park was chosen by the Pennsylvania Department of Conservation and Natural Resources (DCNR) and its Bureau of Parks as one of "25 Must-See Pennsylvania State Parks".

The park will be the only State Park in Pennsylvania to be in the path of totality for the 2024 total solar eclipse that has camping.

History

Native Americans
Pymatuning State Park is on land that was once a very large swamp. The first known inhabitants were the Mound Builders. Two of their mounds were flooded over by the creation of Pymatuning Lake. The Lenape were living in the area when European settlers first came to the area. The lake is named for the chief, who lived in the area at the time, Pihmtomink. The Lenape were pushed out of the area by the Seneca tribe a member of the larger Iroquois Confederacy. The Seneca were defeated by General Anthony Wayne's forces during the Northwest Indian War and left the area under the terms of the Treaty of Greenville. This treaty marked the beginning of the white man's domination of the area.

From swamplands to parklands
The first settlers to the area were farmers. Life was not easy for the farmers. The land was very swampy and very difficult to reclaim. Farm animals that wandered off were often lost in the quicksands of the swamp or fell prey to predators like foxes, bears and mountain lions. The swamps were infested with mosquitoes that brought yellow fever to the settlers.

Building a dam on the Shenango River was first explored in 1911. A massive flood in 1913 caused $3 million in damage and took several lives. The Pennsylvania General Assembly approved a budget of $1.2 million to build at dam across the Shenango, but Governor John K. Tener slashed the budget to just $100,000. The legislature took action again in 1917. This time approving a $400,000 budget under the condition that the needed land in Ohio be purchased by the private sector. The Pymatuning Land Company was formed and raised the needed funds to purchase the needed Ohio properties. The land was finally acquired in full by 1931 when Governor Gifford Pinchot approved $1.5 million to complete the dam. 7,000 men began work on the dam in 1931, and the project was completed in 1934.

Pymatuning Lake

Pymatuning Lake was formed in the 1930s by a dam on the Shenango River.  The lake features multiple beaches and camping areas in both Pennsylvania and Ohio. The northeastern part of Pymatuning Lake, east of the spillway and three miles (5 km) south of Linesville, is a protected gameland where colonies of 20,000 Canada geese and many more ducks winter each year. The lake is the result of an earth dam three miles (5 km) north of Jamestown, Pennsylvania, whose outflow forms the Shenango River. A north-south spillway crosses the northern part of the lake, with the gameland on the east side.

Along this spillway are a wildlife museum and the Linesville spillway, a site famous as "The Place Where the Ducks Walk on the Fishes' Backs". Many people throw bread into the water here, and the resulting density of fish (carp) enables the ducks and other waterfowl to walk on top of the carp to vie for the thrown food. The spillway was renovated in 2007. The Pennsylvania Department of Conservation and Natural Resources had planned to prohibit bread as food for the carp and ducks on January 1, 2009, only permitting commercial fish food as part of an effort to clean up the area and increase its wild nature, but subsequently reconsidered.

Boating

All boats must have a current registration with any state or a launch permit from the Pennsylvania Fish and Boat Commission. There are three marinas in the Pennsylvania owned part of the lake. These marinas have mooring facilities and rent pontoon boats, rowboats, motorboats, canoes, and motors. They also have stores that sell bait, tackle and snacks.

Fishing
Pymatuning State Park is open for year-round fishing on Pymatuning Lake. It is a warm water fishery. The most common species are largemouth and smallmouth bass, walleye, bluegill, crappie, perch, carp, and muskellunge. The lake is a popular ice fishing destination during the winter months. All anglers are expected to follow the rules and regulations of the fish commission. Licenses from Ohio and Pennsylvania are permitted if the fishermen are fishing from a boat in any section of the lake. Only Pennsylvania licensed fishermen can fish from the Pennsylvania shore and only Ohio licensed fishermen are permitted to fish from the Ohio shore.

One of the largest warm water fish hatcheries in the world is owned and operated by the Pennsylvania Fish and Boat Commission at Pymatuning State Park.

Swimming
There are four beaches that are open to the public at Pymatuning State Park. All four are open from 8:00 a.m. until sunset beginning in late-May and ending mid-September. Lifeguards are not posted at the beach. Swim at your own risk. The beaches do have bathhouses with restrooms.

Wildlife
Pymatuning State Park is home to a wide variety of wildlife. Bald eagles make their nests in the trees on the shores of Pymatuning Lake. Migratory waterfowl and resident waterfowl thrive in the waters of the lake. The Pennsylvania Game Commission operates a waterfowl museum at the park. The land surrounding the lake is ideal habitat for white tailed deer and other woodland animals.

Hunting
Hunters are expected to follow the rules and regulations of the Pennsylvania Game Commission. The common game species are squirrels, waterfowl, white-tailed deer, and rabbits. The hunting of groundhogs is prohibited. Special areas of the lake are set aside for waterfowl hunting.

Staying overnight
Pymatuning State Park is open for overnight guests beginning in mid-April and ending in late-October.
 
There are two camping areas at the park. They are near the lake and have a sanitary dumping station. Linesville Campground is in the northern part of the park. It has modern facilities including modern bathhouses with flush toilets and hot showers. Tuttle Campground is closed.  Jamestown campgrounds is within walking distances of small stores that sell a variety of camping supplies and groceries. Laundry facilities are located at each of the stores.

There are twenty five modern cabins available to rent at Pymatuning State Park. Each cabin has a furnished living area, a kitchen and dining area, restrooms, and two or three bedrooms. Bed linens, towels, tableware and cookware are not provided.

Nearby state parks
The following state parks are within  of Pymatuning State Park:
Erie Bluffs State Park (Erie County)
Maurice K. Goddard State Park (Mercer County)
Mosquito Lake State Park (Ohio)
Pymatuning State Park (Ohio)

References

External links

  

Protected areas established in 1934
State parks of Pennsylvania
Parks in Crawford County, Pennsylvania
Fish hatcheries in the United States
Agricultural buildings and structures in Pennsylvania
Protected areas of Crawford County, Pennsylvania